Idlewild is the sixth and final studio album by American hip hop duo Outkast. It was released on August 22, 2006, by LaFace Records and served as the soundtrack album to the duo's musical film of the same name, which was released that same month. Containing themes relating to the music industry, the album also featured songs not included in the film while incorporating jazz, blues, swing, and soul styles in its music.

The album debuted at number two on the US Billboard 200 chart, selling 196,000 copies in its first week. It achieved minimal international charting and produced five singles that attained moderate Billboard chart success. Despite mixed criticism towards its unconventional musical style and loose thematic structure, Idlewild received positive reviews from most music critics upon its release. The album has been certified platinum in sales by the Recording Industry Association of America for shipments of one million copies in the United States.

Background
Though less a soundtrack and more of a companion album, the Idlewild album features seven songs from the Idlewild film: "Chronomentrophobia", "Makes No Sense at All", "PJ and Rooster", "Greatest Show on Earth", "When I Look in Your Eyes", and, from the end credits, "Morris Brown". Two snippets of film dialogue are also included on the album as interludes. The rest of the songs performed in the film were included on the earlier OutKast LPs Big Boi and Dre Present...Outkast and Speakerboxxx/The Love Below. In an interview for Billboard, Big Boi stated "This is an OutKast album. It isn't like a soundtrack where we go get this person or that person".

According to PopMatters critic Tim O'Neil, Idlewilds music was "not merely contemporary hip-hop, but a unique hybridization of modern hip-hop with vintage big-band jazz and Delta blues." Jess Harvell from Pitchfork observed imitations of hot jazz and jump blues songs throughout the record, while New York Post writer Dan Aquilante said the album mixed hip hop, jazz, blues, swing, and soul music, as OutKast "chronicled African American musical history with original tunes that transcend race and time".

Release and reception

Idlewilds release was delayed several times in 2005 before being released in 2006. In its first week, the album charted at number two on the Billboard 200 and sold 196,000 copies in the United States. The album dropped to the number seven in its second week, selling an additional 78,000 units. On September 26, 2006, it was certified platinum by the Recording Industry Association of America, having shipped one million copies in the US. In Canada, it was certified gold by the Canadian Recording Industry Association.

Idlewild received generally positive reviews from critics. At Metacritic, which assigns a normalized rating out of 100 to reviews from mainstream publications, the album received an average score of 72, based on 30 reviews. Q called it "a dazzling album", while Ben Williams of New York found it "entertaining and surprisingly consistent". The Guardians Alexis Petridis wrote that it "bulges with brilliant ideas... Ambitious but flawed, at turns stunning, maddening and confusing". Rob Sheffield from Rolling Stone compared Idlewild to Prince's Parade (1986), while praising its "deeply eccentric richness" and calling it "so suave on the surface, it takes a few spins to absorb how radical it is". Although she felt it lacked cohesion and a "clear message", Ann Powers of the Los Angeles Times found the album "sonically challenging and lyrically wide-ranging", including songs for "contemplation and booty-shaking". Writing for MSN Music, Robert Christgau called Idlewild "a joyous mishmash" and praised each OutKast-member's distinct performance: "from the mainstream hip-hop Big Boi articulates with so much muscle to the retro swing Andre sings just fine, they sound happy to parade their mastery". Uncut described it as "Stylish and substantial, it's a deft masterpastiche that dissolves history for its own entertainment".<ref name="Metacritic">{{cite web|url=https://www.metacritic.com/music/idlewild|title=Idlewild (2006): Reviews|website=Metacritic|accessdate=July 9, 2009}}</ref> Mojo stated, "Every time you think you've got Idlewild figured out, it zips off in a totally unexpected new direction".

According to NME critic Dan Martin, other critics might have found Idlewild to be "a bit long and uneven and self-indulgent". In a negative review for the Chicago Sun-Times, Jim DeRogatis viewed the album as unfocused and stated, "it's all about heavy-handed, faux Scott Joplin ragtime piano; showy but lame Cab Calloway horn arrangements; fake Rudy Vallee crooning (courtesy of Benjamin's nasal, off-key whine) and ultra-hammy vaudeville shucking and jiving". The Washington Posts J. Freedom du Lac noted a "creative schism" in the duo and wrote, "For all of its flashes of greatness - the brassy marching-band rap of 'Morris Brown', the psychedelic hip-hop flashback 'Train', the Stevie Wonder-inspired acoustic blues number 'Idlewild Blue (Don'tchu Worry 'Bout Me)' - the staggeringly eclectic 'Idlewild' includes too much filler and too many outright stink bombs to deserve a place alongside the best pop offerings of 2006, let alone Aquemini, et al". Preston Jones from Slant Magazine called it "frustrating, uneven, and strained ... an interesting failure". Spin magazine's Charles Aaron called it "a perplexing album", despite how it "grasps for a distinctive sound, departing almost entirely from rap per se" in favor of music from "the jazz/jump blues from the film's '30s/40's demimonde, as well as shades of Prince's most fitfully eclectic periods".

Track listing
Writing and production credits for Idlewild adapted from liner notes.
All tracks produced by André 3000, except where noted.

Notes
In the album booklet, the producer for "A Bad Note" is listed as Johnny Vulture, which actually stands as a nickname for André 3000.

Sample credits
"Mighty 'O" contains a portion of the composition "Minnie the Moocher" - written by Cab Calloway, Clarence Gaskill and Irving Mills - as performed by Cab Calloway.
"Peaches" contains a sample from "Cuss Words" as performed by Too Short.
"The Train", "Call the Law", "Buggface" and "PJ & Rooster" contain dialogue from the film Idlewild.

Personnel
Credits for Idlewild adapted from AllMusic.

 Kory Aaron – assistant engineer
 Malik Albert – engineer, audio production
 Victor Alexander – drums
 Vincent Alexander – assistant engineer
 Kori Anders – engineer, assistant engineer, mixing assistant
 André 3000 – executive producer, guitars, piano, arranger, keyboards, programming, vocals, background vocals, producer, drum programming
 Bamboo – vocals
 Warren Bletcher – assistant engineer, mixing assistant
 Steven Boos – drums
 Jeff Bowden – keyboards
 Leslie Brathwaite – mixing
 David "Whild" Brown – background vocals
 Myrna "Peach" Brown – vocals
 Sleepy Brown – vocals, background vocals
 Ralph Cacciurri – engineer
 Chris Carmouche – engineer, mixing, audio production
 Preston Crump – bass
 Cutmaster Swift – scratching
 Regina Davenport – A&R
 Sean Davis – engineer, audio production
 Dookieblossumgame – vocals
 Tom Doty – mixing assistant
 Eddie Ellis – conductor
 Gary Fly – engineer, assistant engineer, mixing assistant
 Jerry Freeman – cornet, horn, horn arrangements
 John Frye – audio production, engineer, mixing
 Joi Gilliam – vocals, background vocals
 Macy Gray – vocals
 Bernie Grundman – mastering
 Robert Hannon – engineer, assistant engineer
 Mike Hardnett – guitar
 Tuesday Henderson – percussion
 John Holmes – engineer, assistant engineer, mixing assistant, audio production
 Aaron Holton – assistant engineer
 Hot Tub Tony – background vocals
 Josh Houghkirk – mixing assistant
 Chris Jackson – engineer
 Kevin Kendricks – piano, keyboards, horn arrangements, producer
 Debra Killings – bass, vocals, background vocals
 Chuck Lightning – arranger, producer
 Lil Wayne – vocals
 Ryan McDaniels – assistant engineer
 Janelle Monáe – arranger, vocals, background vocals, producer
 Morris Brown College Gospel Choir – instrumentation
 Vernon Mungo – engineer
 Wyatt Oates – assistant engineer
 Organized Noize – programming, producer, drum programming
 Marvin "Chanz" Parkman – keyboards
 Mike Patterson – bass, guitar
 Antwan Patton – executive producer
 Josh Phillips – assistant engineer
 Neil Pogue – mixing
 Chris Rakestraw – mixing assistant
 Dave Robbins – bass, keyboards
 Albey Scholl – harmonica
 Rob Skipworth – assistant engineer, mixing assistant
 Skreechy Peachy – vocals, background vocals
 Terry Smith – background vocals
 Snoop Dogg – vocals
 Matthew Still – audio production, engineer, assistant engineer
 Phil Tan – mixing
 Denise Trorman – art direction, design
 Uncoolgirlz Choir – background vocals
 Johnny Vulture – producer
 David Whild – guitar, background vocals
 Melissa Zampatti – vocals

Chart positions

Weekly charts

Year-end charts

Certifications

References

External links
 Idlewild'' at Discogs
 

Albums produced by Organized Noize
Albums produced by André 3000
Musical film soundtracks
Outkast albums
2006 soundtrack albums
Hip hop soundtracks